Fyodorovsky is a rural locality (a khutor) in Sredneikoretskoye Rural Settlement, Liskinsky District, Voronezh Oblast, Russia. The population was 79 as of 2010. There are 2 streets.

Geography 
Fyodorovsky is located 34 km northeast of Liski (the district's administrative centre) by road. Neskuchny is the nearest rural locality.

References 

Rural localities in Liskinsky District